The 2016 United States Senate election in Ohio was held November 8, 2016, to elect a member of the United States Senate to represent the State of Ohio, concurrently with the 2016 U.S. presidential election, as well as other elections to the United States Senate in other states and elections to the United States House of Representatives and various state and local elections. The close of registration for electors in the primary election was December 16, 2015, and the primary election took place on March 15, 2016. Incumbent Republican U.S. Senator Rob Portman faced former Democratic Governor Ted Strickland. Green Party nominee Joseph  DeMare was also on the ballot along with two other independent candidates and one officially declared write-in candidate.

Initially, the seat was viewed by many to be a potential Democratic pickup, with some early polls showing Strickland ahead, but Portman attained a lead in the summer which grew through the duration of the campaign, and ultimately won re-election to a second term in a landslide, winning 58% of the vote. His vote total of 3,118,567 is the second largest in the state's history, falling 346,084 votes short of George Voinovich's record set in his 2004 re-election.

Republican primary 
Republican Senator Rob Portman ran for re-election to a second term in office. He considered running for president in 2016, but ruled out running for two offices at the same time, even though Ohio law does allow it. He ultimately declined to run for president. The National Organization for Marriage and other socially conservative groups, unhappy with Portman's public backing for same-sex marriage, pledged to back a primary challenger. Tea Party groups, who heavily backed Portman in 2010, said that they were unlikely to do the same if he runs for re-election.

Candidates

Declared 
 Rob Portman, incumbent senator.
 Don Elijah Eckhart, independent candidate for OH-15 in 2008

Disqualified 
 Melissa Strzala, Tea Party activist (failed to gather enough valid signatures)

Declined 
 Josh Mandel, Ohio State Treasurer and nominee for the U.S. Senate in 2012
 Steve Stivers, U.S. Representative

Endorsements

Polling

Results

Democratic primary

Candidates

Declared 
 Kelli Prather, occupational therapist and community organizer
 P.G. Sittenfeld, Cincinnati City Councilman
 Ted Strickland, former governor of Ohio and former U.S. Representative

Withdrawn 
 Bob Hagan, former member of the Ohio State Board of Education and former state representative

Declined 
 Joyce Beatty, U.S. Representative
 John Boccieri, former U.S. Representative
 Jennifer Brunner, judge on the Ohio Tenth District Court of Appeals, former Ohio Secretary of State and candidate for the U.S. Senate in 2010
 Michael B. Coleman, Mayor of Columbus
 Richard Cordray, director of the Consumer Financial Protection Bureau, former Ohio Attorney General and candidate for the U.S. Senate in 2000
 Connie Pillich, former state representative and nominee for Ohio State Treasurer in 2014
 Tim Ryan, U.S. Representative
 Betty Sutton, Administrator of the Saint Lawrence Seaway Development Corporation and former U.S. Representative
 Nina Turner, former state senator and nominee for Ohio Secretary of State in 2014
 Nan Whaley, Mayor of Dayton

Endorsements

Polling

Results

Green primary

Candidates

Declared 
 Joe DeMare, factory worker and environmentalist

Results

General election

Candidates 
 Rob Portman (R), incumbent senator
 Ted Strickland (D), former governor of Ohio and former U.S. Representative
 Joe DeMare (G), factory worker and environmentalist
 Scott Rupert (I), truck driver and candidate for the U.S. Senate in 2012
 Tom Connors (I)
 James Stahl (Write-in)

Endorsements

Debates

Predictions

Polling

Results

By congressional district
Portman won 13 of 16 congressional districts, including the 13th, held by Democrat Tim Ryan and which Hillary Clinton also won in the presidential race.

Analysis
Despite being seen early on as a tight race, Portman began to gain the upper hand as Strickland's campaign was said to be the worst he had ever run.  Portman received the endorsements of many labor unions including the Ohio Teamsters and the United Mine Workers Union, both of which usually endorsed Democrats.  In the end Portman ended up winning in a landslide, the only region where Strickland outperformed Hillary Clinton was in Appalachia, but his performance there was still disappointing for an area he used to represent in Congress.

References

External links 
Official campaign websites (Archived)
 Rob Portman (R) for Senate
 Ted Strickland (D) for Senate
 Joe DeMare (G) for Senate
 Scott Rupert (I) for Senate
 Tom Connors (I) for Senate

2016
Ohio
United States Senate